Lanark Village is an unincorporated community in Franklin County, Florida, United States, located along U.S. 98, on the Gulf of Mexico. In the late 19th and early 20th centuries, it was known as Lanark-on-the-Gulf.

The Lanark Inn

Lanark-on-the-Gulf was a resort with a large hotel, the Lanark Inn, patronized principally by people from Tallahassee. The hotel's brochure claimed that Lanark "is the most picturesque place in western Florida".

It was destroyed in the second hurricane of 1899, but was rebuilt. The rebuilt Lanark Inn was destroyed by fire in 1907, reopening after rebuilding in 1908. It had 100 rooms, and had live music almost every night at the dock, where there was a dancing pavilion.

The dock was connected to the hotel by a boardwalk. The Carrabelle, Tallahassee & Georgia Railroad ran excursion trains from Tallahassee.

Camp Gordon Johnston

The Lanark Inn was torn down at the beginning of the United States' involvement in World War II, and was replaced in 1942 by Camp Gordon Johnston. This Army base trained 
amphibious soldiers and their support teams. A quarter of a million men were trained there. The trained soldiers were used in the D-Day attack.

The camp closed in June 1946.

See also
Lanark Reef

References

External links
Lanark Village, Florida (Florida HomeTown Locator)

Unincorporated communities in Franklin County, Florida
Beaches of Franklin County, Florida
Unincorporated communities in Florida
Populated coastal places in Florida on the Gulf of Mexico
Beaches of Florida